Livinus Nnochiri is a Nigerian actor. He was awarded the 2018 City People Movie Special Recognition Award.

Filmography 
 Bond (2019 film)
 Be with me - 2022 alongside Patience Ozokwor 
 Ages  - 2021 alongside Florence Owanta Yannick Annoh
 Maya - 2016
 Beautiful Soul - 2008
 Beautiful Soul 2 - 2008
 Wind of Glory - 2007
 Wind of Glory 2 - 2007
 Superstory.

References

Year of birth missing (living people)
Living people
Nigerian male film actors
Igbo actors
21st-century Nigerian actors